Jing Wong is the name of:
 Wong Jing (born 1955), pinyin Wang Jing, Hong Kong film director, producer, actor, presenter, and screenwriter
 Wong Jinglun (born 1983), English name Jing Wong, Singaporean Mandopop singer, actor